Esbon is a city in Jewell County, Kansas, United States.  As of the 2020 census, the population of the city was 69.

History
Esbon was laid out in 1873. It was incorporated as a city in 1904.

The first post office in Esbon was established in January 1874.

Esbon was a shipping point on the Chicago, Rock Island and Pacific Railroad.

Geography
Esbon is located at  (39.822656, -98.433762).

The town lies 2.5 miles north of U.S. Route 36, and 13 miles west of Mankato, the county seat of Jewell County.

Demographics

2010 census
As of the census of 2010, there were 99 people, 52 households, and 24 families living in the city. The racial makeup of the city was 91.9% White, 1.0% African American, 3.0% Native American, and 4.0% from two or more races. Hispanic or Latino of any race were 1.0% of the population.

There were 52 households, of which 19.2% had children under the age of 18 living with them, 38.5% were married couples living together, 1.9% had a female householder with no husband present, 5.8% had a male householder with no wife present, and 53.8% were non-families. 48.1% of all households were made up of individuals, and 21.2% had someone living alone who was 65 years of age or older. The average household size was 1.90 and the average family size was 2.67.

The median age in the city was 52.3 years. 19.2% of residents were under the age of 18; 4.1% were between the ages of 18 and 24; 18.2% were from 25 to 44; 28.4% were from 45 to 64; and 30.3% were 65 years of age or older. The gender makeup of the city was 54.5% male and 45.5% female.

2000 census
As of the census of 2000, there were 148 people, 71 households, and 37 families living in the city. The racial makeup of the city was 96.62% White and 3.38% Native American.

There were 71 households, out of which 19.7% had children under the age of 18 living with them, 46.5% were married couples living together, 7.0% had a female householder with no husband present, and 46.5% were non-families. 45.1% of all households were made up of individuals, and 23.9% had someone living alone who was 65 years of age or older. The average household size was 2.08 and the average family size was 3.00.

In the city, the population was spread out, with 23.0% under the age of 18, 4.7% from 18 to 24, 25.7% from 25 to 44, 20.3% from 45 to 64, and 26.4% who were 65 years of age or older. The median age was 44 years. For every 100 females, there were 87.3 males. For every 100 females age 18 and over, there were 103.6 males.

The median income for a household in the city was $26,875, and the median income for a family was $34,167. Males had a median income of $24,688 versus $13,125 for females. The per capita income for the city was $17,438. There were none of the families and 6.7% of the population living below the poverty line, including no under eighteens and 16.7% of those over 64.

Religion
The community has a Roman Catholic church (Sacred Heart), a United Methodist Church, and a Church of Christ.

Economy
The primary business enterprise of the town is a grain elevator at the north end of Grand Avenue.  Farming is the principal occupation in the area around Esbon.

Education
The community is served by Rock Hills USD 107 public school district. Esbon became a part of Rock Hills USD 107 located in Mankato in 2006 as the district was formed that year by the consolidation of White Rock USD 104 and Mankato USD 278.  The Rock Hills High School mascot is Grizzlies. Esbon had an elementary school and high school until 1983. The Esbon High School mascot was Esbon Tigers.

The Esbon Tigers won the Kansas State High School boys class B Track & Field championship in 1947.

School unification consolidated Esbon and Burr Oak schools forming White Rock schools in 1983. Esbon was home of White Rock Middle school located at 203 Grand Ave. The White Rock elementary school and high school were located in Burr Oak. White Rock High School's mascot was the Eagles.

References

Further reading

External links
 Esbon - Directory of Public Officials
 Historic Images of Esbon, Wichita State University Library
 Esbon city map, KDOT

Cities in Kansas
Cities in Jewell County, Kansas